Shivajirao Patil Nilangekar became the chief minister of Maharashtra in June 1985, on resignation of Vasantdada Patil. He formed a 11-member ministry that served for less than a year until Nilangekar's resignation amidst fraud allegations.

List of ministers
Nilangekar was sworn in on 3 June 1985, while his ministers were administered oath of office on the next day:

References

Indian National Congress
1985 in Indian politics
N  
Cabinets established in 1985
Cabinets disestablished in 1986